Nemorilloides is a genus of parasitic flies in the family Tachinidae. There are at least two described species in Nemorilloides.

Species
These two species belong to the genus Nemorilloides:
 Nemorilloides carbonatus Mesnil, 1952
 Nemorilloides flaviventris Brauer & Bergenstamm, 1891

References

Further reading

 
 
 
 

Tachinidae
Articles created by Qbugbot